Manuel Pestana Filho (April 27, 1928 – January 8, 2011) was the Roman Catholic bishop of the Roman Catholic Diocese of Anápolis, Brazil.

Ordained to the priesthood in 1952, he was appointed bishop of the Anápolis Diocese in 1987. During this time, Bishop Pestana requested that students and professors of the Canons Regular religious congregation assist in his reforms to the seminary in his diocese. Bishop Athanasius Schneider was amongst the first 12 students of the Canons Regular sent to Brazil. Schneider was ordained by Bishop Pestana on March 25, 1990. 

Bishop Pestana Filho retired in 2004.

Notes

20th-century Roman Catholic bishops in Brazil
1928 births
2011 deaths
Roman Catholic bishops of Anápolis
21st-century Roman Catholic bishops in Brazil